Levels is a small rural community in the Timaru District, New Zealand. It is located east of Pleasant Point and north-west of Timaru. Richard Pearse Airport is located within Levels. Also the Timaru International Motor Raceway is located in the area.

Demographics

Levels had a population of 1,209 at the 2018 New Zealand census, an increase of 75 people (6.6%) since the 2013 census, and an increase of 81 people (7.2%) since the 2006 census. There were 462 households. There were 654 males and 558 females, giving a sex ratio of 1.17 males per female. The median age was 46.1 years (compared with 37.4 years nationally), with 219 people (18.1%) aged under 15 years, 171 (14.1%) aged 15 to 29, 618 (51.1%) aged 30 to 64, and 198 (16.4%) aged 65 or older.

Ethnicities were 91.8% European/Pākehā, 8.7% Māori, 1.7% Pacific peoples, 1.7% Asian, and 3.0% other ethnicities (totals add to more than 100% since people could identify with multiple ethnicities).

The proportion of people born overseas was 8.2%, compared with 27.1% nationally.

Although some people objected to giving their religion, 43.7% had no religion, 44.9% were Christian, 0.5% were Muslim, 0.2% were Buddhist and 2.0% had other religions.

Of those at least 15 years old, 108 (10.9%) people had a bachelor or higher degree, and 240 (24.2%) people had no formal qualifications. The median income was $34,900, compared with $31,800 nationally. The employment status of those at least 15 was that 552 (55.8%) people were employed full-time, 189 (19.1%) were part-time, and 18 (1.8%) were unemployed.

See also
Levels Valley

References

Timaru District
Populated places in Canterbury, New Zealand